Samantar v. Yousuf, 560 U.S. 305 (2010), is a decision by the United States Supreme Court concerning whether Muhammad Ali Samatar, prime minister of Somalia (during the dictatorship of Siad Barre) from 1987 to 1990, could be sued in United States courts for allegedly overseeing killings and other atrocities. Samatar then lived in Virginia, and some of his victims had sued him under the Torture Victim Protection Act of 1991.

In a previous decision, the United States Court of Appeals for the Fourth Circuit held that the former Somalian government official is not covered by, and therefore not entitled to immunity under the Foreign Sovereign Immunities Act. The Court remanded to District Court to determine whether defendant is entitled to common law immunity.

See also
 List of United States Supreme Court cases, volume 560
Jones v. Ministry of Interior for the Kingdom of Saudi Arabia (comparable 2006 decision of the House of Lords)

References

Further reading
.
.

External links
 

United States Constitution Article Three case law
United States Supreme Court cases
United States Supreme Court cases of the Roberts Court
2010 in United States case law
Foreign Sovereign Immunity Act case law
Somalia–United States relations